The Final Cut is a 1995 American action/drama/thriller feature film directed by Roger Christian for Cine Cut Films with a screenplay by Raul Inglis based on a story by Crash Leyland.

Plot
A maniac bomber is ruthlessly targeting Seattle, claiming civilians and bomb disposal teams alike as apartment blocks and office complexes collapse under the impact of his ingenious, complex devices.  Calling in ex-bomb squad operator John Pierce (Sam Elliott) to help them, and using computer assisted disposal techniques and virtual reality simulations, the squad come to a horrifying realization - the bombs are constructed with tricks and traps intended to kill the disposal teams and he is the only person who would know such schemes would be a fellow bomb squad officer. With the police marking Pierce as their number one suspect and the bomber on the brink of one final, cataclysmic attack, Pierce must move quickly to unmask the trigger-man behind the carnage or face taking the rap himself.

Partial cast

Background
The film was released in the U.S. in 1995 by Republic Entertainment with subsequent releases in Germany, Belgium, and South Africa in 1996 and with a video premiere in Portugal in 1997.

Reception

References

External links

1995 films
Films directed by Roger Christian
1990s English-language films
American action drama films
American action thriller films
1990s American films